Dudachensky is a rural locality (a settlement) and the administrative center of Dudachenskoye Rural Settlement, Frolovsky District, Volgograd Oblast, Russia. The population was 576 as of 2010.

Geography 
Dudachensky is located 54 km northeast of Prigorodny (the district's administrative centre) by road. Blagodatny is the nearest rural locality.

References 

Rural localities in Frolovsky District